Caridina spinata, or yellow goldflake as it is commonly known in the aquarium hobby, is a freshwater shrimp from Sulawesi. It is endemic to Lake Towuti. It lives on rocky substrates.

Threats
It is currently under threat by introduced species like the flowerhorn cichlid, pollution by the human activities and pollution by a nickel mine. It is also potentially threatened by the increasing harvest for the aquarium trade.

References

Atyidae
Freshwater crustaceans of Asia
Endemic freshwater shrimp of Sulawesi
Crustaceans described in 1937